The 2002 Sirius Satellite Radio 400 was the 15th stock car race of the 2002 NASCAR Winston Cup Series and the 34th iteration of the event. The race was held on Sunday, June 16, 2002, in Brooklyn, Michigan, at Michigan International Speedway, a two-mile (3.2 km) moderate-banked D-shaped speedway. The race took the scheduled 200 laps to complete. At race's end, Matt Kenseth, driving for Roush Racing, would defend the field on old tires on the final restart with three to go to win his fourth career NASCAR Winston Cup Series win and his third of the season. To fill out the podium, Dale Jarrett of Robert Yates Racing and Ryan Newman of Penske Racing would finish second and third, respectively.

Background 

The race was held at Michigan International Speedway, a two-mile (3.2 km) moderate-banked D-shaped speedway located in Brooklyn, Michigan. The track is used primarily for NASCAR events. It is known as a "sister track" to Texas World Speedway as MIS's oval design was a direct basis of TWS, with moderate modifications to the banking in the corners, and was used as the basis of Auto Club Speedway. The track is owned by International Speedway Corporation. Michigan International Speedway is recognized as one of motorsports' premier facilities because of its wide racing surface and high banking (by open-wheel standards; the 18-degree banking is modest by stock car standards).

Entry list 

 (R) denotes rookie driver.

 (R) denotes rookie driver.

*Withdrew.

Practice 
Originally, three practices were scheduled to be held, with a session on Friday and two on Saturday. However, early rain on Saturday would cancel the first Saturday session.

First practice 
The first practice session was held on Friday, June 14, at 11:20 AM EST, and would last for 2 hours.

Second and final practice 
The second and final practice session, sometimes referred to as Happy Hour, was held on Saturday, June 15, at 11:15 AM EST, and would last for 45 minutes.

Qualifying 
Qualifying was held on Friday, June 14, at 3:05 PM EST. Each driver would have two laps to set a fastest time; the fastest of the two would count as their official qualifying lap. Positions 1-36 would be decided on time, while positions 37-43 would be based on provisionals. Six spots are awarded by the use of provisionals based on owner's points. The seventh is awarded to a past champion who has not otherwise qualified for the race. If no past champ needs the provisional, the next team in the owner points will be awarded a provisional.

No drivers would fail to qualify.

Full qualifying results

Race results

References 

2002 NASCAR Winston Cup Series
NASCAR races at Michigan International Speedway
June 2002 sports events in the United States
2002 in sports in Michigan